The Trowbridge Road-Grand Trunk Western Railroad Bridge is a bridge carrying Trowbridge Road over the Grand Trunk Western Railroad in Bloomfield Hills, Michigan. It was listed on the National Register of Historic Places in 2000.

History
In the late 1910s, there was significant pressure to upgrade Woodward Avenue, a major artery carrying traffic from Detroit to Pontiac. In response, the road commissions of Wayne, Oakland and Macomb Counties and the affected municipalities created a regional master plan for improvements. In 1923, the state agreed to  share in some of the cost of improving the infrastructure. The state led the effort to secure a right-of-way along the Woodward corridor; one of the major impediments was the existence of the Grand Trunk Western Railroad track paralleling Woodward.

After protracted legal wrangling, the railroad and the state came to an agreement, and the tracks were shifted to a new location. As part of the new construction, a series of bridges were designed by the railroad to carry street over the new tracks. Sixteen bridges were built by A. Guthrie & Company of St. Paul, Minnesota in 1930, but the Trowbridge Road bridge was not completed until 1931.

The bridge was closed in 2017, and as of 2019 was slated for demolition.

Description

The Trowbridge Road bridge is a seven span, concrete T-beam structure. It is 231 feet long, with a 44-foot-wide deck carrying a 30-foot-wide roadway. It has false concrete arches with recessed panels in the spandrels. The railings are solid concrete parapets with paneled concrete posts and three recessed rectangular panels between each. The date  "1930" is chiseled into the parapets at each end. The ends curve out before terminating in concrete posts, and chain-link fencing lines the inside of the railing.

References

External links
 Trowbridge Road Bridge at HistoricBridges.org

		
National Register of Historic Places in Oakland County, Michigan
Bridges completed in 1931